Kowalewo Opactwo-Parcele  is a village in the administrative district of Gmina Słupca, within Słupca County, Greater Poland Voivodeship, in west-central Poland.

The village has a population of 125.

References

Kowalewo Opactwo-Parcele